The Ouachita are a Native American tribe who lived in northeastern Louisiana along the Ouachita River. Their name has also been pronounced as Washita by English speakers. The spelling "Ouachita" and pronunciation "Wah-sha-taw" came about as a result of French settlers and their influence.  Many landscape features and places have been named for them since colonization of the region by Europeans and Americans.

History
The Ouachita were loosely affiliated with the Caddo Confederacy. Their traditional homelands were the lower reaches of the Ouachita River in present-day northeastern Louisiana and along the Black River. Around 1690, the tribe is believed to have settled at Pargoud Landing on the Ouachita River. This was later the site of a French trading post, and ultimately the present-day city of Monroe, Louisiana developed around it.

Jean-Baptiste Le Moyne, Sieur de Bienville, a French-Canadian colonizer, encountered the Ouachita people in 1700. He first met members of the tribe transporting salt to the Taensa. Bienville traveled to the principal Ouachita village, which he described as housing 70 people in five houses. The Ouachita assimilated into the Natchitoches tribe by the 1720s. Today's descendants are enrolled in the Caddo Nation of Oklahoma.

The Ouachita are known for their traditional practice of burying horses.

Namesakes
The Ouachita Mountains of Oklahoma and Arkansas and Ouachita River of Arkansas and Louisiana were named for the tribe, as was Lake Ouachita. The Washita River, Ouachita Parish, Louisiana, and Washita County, Oklahoma, were also named for the tribe, as well as the town of Washita, Oklahoma.

According to the Encyclopedia of Oklahoma History and Culture, the name comes from the French transliteration of the Caddo word washita, meaning "good hunting grounds."  Louis R. Harlan claimed that "Ouachita" is composed of the Choctaw words ouac for buffalo and chito for large, together meaning "country of large buffaloes".  At one time, herds of buffalo inhabited the lowland areas of the Ouachitas.  Historian Muriel H. Wright wrote that "Ouachita" is composed of the Choctaw words owa for hunt and chito for big, together meaning "big hunt far from home".

Spelling variations
The Ouachita tribe became known among English speakers as the Washita tribe; both spellings are transliterations in European languages (French and English, respectively) of the pronunciation of their Caddo name. They may also be known as the Yesito.

Notes

References
 Bolton, Herbet E. The Hasinais: Southern Caddoans As Seen by the Earliest Europeans. Norman: University of Oklahoma Press, 2002. .
 Sturtevant, William C., general editor and Raymond D. Fogelson, volume editor. Handbook of North American Indians: Southeast. Volume 14. Washington DC: Smithsonian Institution, 2004. .

External links
The Caddo Indians of Louisiana.

Caddoan peoples
Native American tribes in Louisiana
Native American tribes in Oklahoma
Native American tribes in Texas
Native American history of Louisiana